Infant oral mutilation (IOM) is a dangerous and sometimes fatal traditional dental procedure performed in many areas of Africa.

Description
Typically, a parent may take a sick child to a traditional healer, who will look in the child's mouth and attribute the illness to "tooth worms". The healer will point out the small, white, developing tooth buds as being "tooth worms", and then dig the "worms" out of the gums without local anesthesia and using a non-sterile tool (normally a bicycle spoke). The canine teeth are often the ones pointed out, as they are  more prominent. The excised tooth buds are then shown to the parent, their small, milky appearance somewhat resembling worms.

Harm
This practice inflicts pain and suffering on a child who may already be sick (or teething), and in some cases it is carried out on a healthy child in a bid to prevent illness. The unhygienic methods can cause blood infections, tetanus, pass on HIV/AIDS, and can on occasion be fatal during or after the procedure. The underlying permanent tooth buds can be damaged or eradicated, causing lifelong dental problems. Dental care providers, especially outside Africa, may not necessarily be equipped with the knowledge or skills to diagnose and manage the consequences of this procedure.
In addition, the existing illness may not receive the medical attention necessary.

Geographic extent
There is published evidence of IOM occurring in Chad, DR Congo, Ethiopia, Kenya, Rwanda, Somalia, Sudan, Tanzania and Uganda. It has also been observed in African immigrants now living in France, Israel,
USA, Australia, Norway, New Zealand and the UK.  A Literature analysis of the above published papers with full references is available online.

References

External links 

 Infant oral mutilation at the United Kingdom charity Dentaid

Health in Africa
Traditional African medicine
Mutilation
Children's rights